Speedwell may refer to:

Plants
 Speedwell, several plants in the genus Veronica

Places

Australia
 Speedwell, Queensland, a locality in the South Burnett Region, Queensland

United Kingdom
 Speedwell, Bristol, England
 Speedwell Castle, Staffordshire, England
 Speedwell Cavern, Derbyshire, England, a former 18th Century lead mine
 Speedwell Mill, 18th century mill in Wirksworth, Derbyshire
 Speedwell Farm, Woburn, Bedfordshire, designed in 1795 by Robert Salmon
 Speedwell Hill, Cheshire, former site of the Bluecap Memorial

United States
 Speedwell, Kentucky, an unincorporated community
 Speedwell, New Jersey, an unincorporated community
 Speedwell, Tennessee, an unincorporated community
 Speedwell, Virginia, an unincorporated community
 Speedwell Township, St. Clair County, Missouri, an inactive township

Falkland Islands
 Speedwell Island in Falkland Sound

Australia
Speedwell in the vicinity of Hivesville, Queensland

Manufacturing and vehicles
 Speedwell Forge, Lancaster County, Pennsylvania
 Speedwell Ironworks, and Speedwell Village, Morristown, New Jersey
 Troublesome Creek Ironworks, from 1771, North Carolina, originally called Speedwell Furnace
 Speedwell Motor Car Company, an early car manufacturer
 Speedwell GT version of the Austin-Healey Sebring Sprite sports car
 Speedwell bicycles, made in Sydney, Australia, from 1882
 Speedwellbus, a former bus company in Manchester, England

Ships
 Speedwell (ship) lists ships with the name Speedwell including:
 Speedwell (1577 ship) transported Pilgrims with Mayflower

Fictional characters
 Speedwell, a rabbit character in the Watership Down novel
 Mrs Speedwell, a character in Tit for Tat (1921 film)
 Speedwell, a character in Death Comes to Time, a Doctor Who-based audio drama
 Mrs Speedwell, a character in The Glorious Dead (Upstairs, Downstairs)

Music
"Speedwell" song on the album You Need a Mess of Help to Stand Alone by Saint Etienne
Dan B. Speedwell, musician on the album Liberty Belle and the Black Diamond Express by The Go-Betweens

Other uses
Speedwell Weather Limited, a company making Weather derivative software
"Speedwell" whistle, by Henry Arthur Ward
Speedwell, an 18th-century Thoroughbred racehorse, winner of the 1894 Middle Park Stakes

See also
 Operation Speedwell, a World War II British raid into Italy